Jed Solomon (born December 29, 1992) is an American football placekicker who is currently a free agent. He has played for the Cleveland Gladiators of the Arena Football League, the Atlanta Havoc of the American Arena League (AAL), and the Columbus Lions of the National Arena League.

College career
After graduating from Lowndes High School in Valdosta, Georgia, Solomon attended Troy University and played for the Troy Trojans football team. He graduated in 2015, ranked second all time in field goal percentage, with 78.9%.

Professional career
After going undrafted in the 2016 NFL Draft, Solomon eventually signed with the Cleveland Gladiators of the Arena Football League on May 18, 2017, during the 2017 Arena Football League season. In the 2017 season, Solomon went 16-for-28 on PAT attempts. He was placed on reassignment on June 14, 2017.

He signed with the Atlanta Havoc for the 2018 season. He went 85–91 on PAT's leaving him with 93% made and was voted the league's best kicker.

Solomon also played in 2021 for the Columbus Lions.

References

External links
arenafan.com profile
Troy Trojans bio

1992 births
Living people
People from Valdosta, Georgia
Players of American football from Georgia (U.S. state)
Jewish American sportspeople
American football placekickers
Troy Trojans football players
Cleveland Gladiators players
Atlanta Havoc players
Columbus Lions players
21st-century American Jews